Kathleen Gretchen "Kay" Williams Gable (August 7, 1916 – May 25, 1983) was an American actress. She appeared in numerous uncredited bit parts throughout the 1940s before playing Hazel Dawn in George Cukor's The Actress (1953).

Career
Williams was placed under contract with Metro-Goldwyn-Mayer in 1943 but appeared in uncredited bit parts for the remainder of the decade.

Personal life
Williams was married four times. Her first marriage to Charles Capps lasted from 1937 to 1939, after which she was married to Martín de Alzaga, an Argentinian cattle tycoon, from 1942 to 1943. She was married to Adolph Bernard Spreckels II, a sugar heir, from 1945 until 1952, with whom she had two children (including Bunker Spreckels). Williams was married to actor Clark Gable from 1955 until his death in 1960. The couple had one child, a son, who was born after his father's death.

Death
Williams, who had battled heart ailments during her life, left California to receive treatment at Methodist Hospital in Houston, Texas, where she died of heart failure on May 25, 1983.

Filmography

References

External links

1916 births
1983 deaths
20th-century American actresses
Actresses from Pennsylvania
Burials at Forest Lawn Memorial Park (Glendale)
Metro-Goldwyn-Mayer contract players
Actors from Erie, Pennsylvania